Ab Rosbag (born 14 March 1940) is a Dutch wrestler. He competed in the men's Greco-Roman welterweight at the 1960 Summer Olympics.

References

1940 births
Living people
Dutch male sport wrestlers
Olympic wrestlers of the Netherlands
Wrestlers at the 1960 Summer Olympics
Sportspeople from Utrecht (city)